Andre Patterson (born May 12, 1983) is an American former professional basketball player. He is the son of Andre Patterson, Sr. who played professionally and the half-brother of Ayanna Patterson

External links
 
 Tennessee Volunteers bio

1983 births
Living people
American expatriate basketball people in Venezuela
Anaheim Arsenal players
Basketball players from Los Angeles
Dakota Wizards players
Los Angeles D-Fenders players
Reno Bighorns players
Tennessee Volunteers basketball players
UCLA Bruins men's basketball players
American men's basketball players
Small forwards